is a Japanese professional footballer who plays as a midfielder for South Korean WK League club Incheon Hyundai Steel Red Angels WFC. She was a member of the Japan women's national team.

Club career
Tanaka was born in Yamaguchi on July 30, 1993. After graduating from JFA Academy Fukushima, she joined INAC Kobe Leonessa in 2012. In 2014, she moved to Nojima Stella Kanagawa Sagamihara. In July 2019, she moved to Sporting de Huelva.

National team career
Tanaka was a member of Japan U-17 national team for 2008 and 2010 U-17 World Cup. At 2010, she played 6 games and 4 goals, and U-17 Japan team won 2nd place. She was also a member of U-20 team for 2012 U-20 World Cup in Japan. She played 6 games and 6 goals. She was selected Silver Shoe awards and Japan won 3rd place. In March 2013, she was selected Japan national team for 2013 Algarve Cup. At this competition, on March 6, she debuted against Norway. She played 4 games for Japan in 2013.

National team statistics

References

External links

1993 births
Living people
Women's association football midfielders
Japanese women's footballers
Association football people from Yamaguchi Prefecture
Japan women's international footballers
Nadeshiko League players
INAC Kobe Leonessa players
Nojima Stella Kanagawa Sagamihara players
Primera División (women) players
Sporting de Huelva players
Japanese expatriate women's footballers
Japanese expatriate sportspeople in Spain
Expatriate women's footballers in Spain